Giles Lyndon Scott  (born 23 June 1987) is a British competitive sailor and four-time Finn Gold Cup winner and two-time Olympic gold medallist who won the gold medal for Team GB in the Finn Class at the 2016 Summer Olympics in Rio de Janeiro where having dominated the class, Scott secured his place in the history books winning the gold medal with a day to spare. He is also a member of the 2021 INEOS TEAM UK America's Cup team campaign with Ben Ainslie Racing where he is tactician.

He was a grinder/trimmer with Luna Rossa Challenge during the 2013 Louis Vuitton Cup.

Early life and education
Scott was born in Huntingdon, Cambridgeshire, to John and Rosalind Scott. His father was a sports administrator and latterly director of the U.K. Anti Doping Agency and Chief Executive of the 2014 Commonwealth Games. His mother was a special needs teacher. Aged 1, he moved to Canada in 1988 where his father worked for the Federal Minister for Amateur Sport. It was in Canada that he had his first sailing experience in dinghies on the Ottawa River. He returned aged 6 in 1993 and was re-introduced to sailing at the inland reservoir at Grafham Water, Cambridgeshire where his parents encouraged him to take up junior competitive sailing. He was educated at Sharnbrook Upper School in Bedfordshire and the University of Southampton where he graduated with a BSc in Geography.

Titles

World Championships titles
 1st 2005 ISAF Youth Sailing World Championships - Laser
 1st 2008 Finn Junior World Championship
 1st 2011 Finn World Championship
 1st 2014 Finn World Championship
 1st 2015 Finn World Championship
 1st 2016 Finn World Championship

European Championships titles
 1st 2011 Finn European Championships
 1st 2014 Finn European Championships
 1st 2019 Finn European Championships

Olympic titles
 1st 2016 Olympic Games
 1st 2020 Olympic Games

References

External links
 
 
 
 
 
 
 

1987 births
Living people
People from Huntingdon
British people of English descent
English male sailors (sport)
English Olympic medallists
Olympic gold medallists for Great Britain
Olympic medalists in sailing
Olympic sailors of Great Britain
Medalists at the 2016 Summer Olympics
Sailors at the 2016 Summer Olympics – Finn
Medalists at the 2020 Summer Olympics
Sailors at the 2020 Summer Olympics – Finn
Extreme Sailing Series sailors
Finn class world champions
World champions in sailing for Great Britain
Members of the Order of the British Empire
2013 America's Cup sailors
2017 America's Cup sailors
2021 America's Cup sailors
Luna Rossa Challenge sailors
People educated at Sharnbrook Academy
Alumni of the University of Southampton